George M. Cohan Tonight! is a 2006 musical, conceived, written and arranged  by Chip Deffaa, with music and lyrics by George M. Cohan, and additional material by Deffaa. It is a one-man show depicting the life and music of Cohan utilizing his songs, dance routines, memoirs, and the stories of those who knew him. Able to be performed in dozen of venues, George M. Cohan Tonight! opened Off-Broadway in 2006 at the Irish Repertory Theatre in New York City. The original cast album is available from Sh-K-Boom Records/Ghostlight Records.

The New York Times hailed the show as "brash, cocky, and endlessly euphoric" (The New York Times, March 11, 2006). The show originally starred Jon Peterson, was directed by Chip Deffaa, with musical direction by Sterling Price-McKinney. The show earned star Jon Peterson a Drama Desk nomination, and author/director Chip Deffaa an IRNE Award (Independent Reviewers of New England).  It is one of six different musicals about Cohan, created for different sized casts and audiences, created by Deffaa.

Productions
Since 2006, George M. Cohan Tonight! has toured the United States appearing in many regional theatre houses. Jon Peterson, Justin Boccitto, and David Herzog have all starred in productions of the show in the US, directed by Deffaa.  George M. Cohan Tonight! made an Asian debut in South Korea in 2007. In August 2008, it made its European debut at the Edinburgh Festival Fringe starring David Herzog.  Herzog is set to star in the show's British debut, opening September 21, 2010 at the New Players Theatre on the West End in London.

Musical Numbers

Hello Broadway/Give My Regards to Broadway  
The Man Who Owns Broadway 
Night Time
Musical Moon
Ireland, My Land of Dreams
I'm Saving Up to Buy a Home for Mother
Josephine/Oh, You Wonderful Girl
The Hinkey Dee
Harrigan
You Won't Do Any Business If You Haven't Got a Band
My Father Told Me
Forty-five Minutes from Broadway 
I'm Awfully Strong For You
  

Oh! You Beautiful Girl/I Want the World to Know
Goodbye Flo
I Want to Hear a Yankee Doodle Tune
The Fatal Curse of Drink
The Yankee Doodle Boy
Mary's a Grand Old Name
You're a Grand Old Flag
Over There
Drink With Me/Did Ya Ever Have One of Those Days?
I Love Everyone In the Wide, Wide World/I'm True to Them All
All-American Sweetheart
I Won't Be An Actor No More
Life's a Funny Proposition After All
All Aboard for Broadway/Give My Regards to Broadway (Reprise)

External links
 www.georgemcohan.org CHip Deffaa website

2006 musicals
Off-Broadway musicals
George M. Cohan